John Anton is the name of:

 John Anton (cricketer) (1926–2021), English cricketer
 John Anton (soccer) (born 1955), American retired soccer forward 
 John P. Anton (1920–2014), professor of Greek philosophy and culture at the University of South Florida